Jurband may refer to:
 Jurband, Behshahr
 Jurband, Nur